"When the Red, Red Robin (Comes Bob, Bob, Bobbin' Along)" is a popular song written, both  words and music, by Harry Woods in 1926.
The song became the signature song for singer and actress Lillian Roth, who performed it often during the height of her musical career from the late 1920s to the late 1930s.

Notable recordings
The song was a hit in 1926 for: "Whispering" Jack Smith; Cliff Edwards; Paul Whiteman; and the band the Ipana Troubadors (vocal by Franklyn Baur). The most successful recording in 1926, however, was by Al Jolson. Jolson recorded it again on December 5, 1947 for Decca Records.
1939 Bob Crosby and His Orchestra – recorded April 7, 1939 for Decca Records (catalog No. 2537A).
1953 – recorded by Doris Day, and briefly reached the charts. 
1956 Bing Crosby recorded the song for use on his radio show and it was subsequently included in the box set The Bing Crosby CBS Radio Recordings (1954-56) issued by Mosaic Records (catalog MD7-245) in 2009. Crosby also included the song in a medley on his album On the Happy Side (1962).
1957 Julie London – for her album Julie.
1958 Eydie Gormé – included in the album Eydie Gormé – Vamps the Roaring 20's.
1973 Dean Martin – Sittin' on Top of the World.
1996 Steve Goodman – The Easter Tapes (Live Steve Goodman album).
2017 Kamasi Washington – Perspective (Harmony of Difference).
Also in the 1950s, a version was released by Peter Pan Records, with "Rock-a-Bye Your Baby with a Dixie Melody" on the reverse side of the single.

Film appearances
1926 A Plantation Act – a sound-on-disc short film – sung by Al Jolson.
1932 When the Red, Red Robin Comes Comes Bob, Bob, Bobbin' Along – a Fleischer Studios Screen Song cartoon.
1949 Jolson Sings Again – sung by Larry Parks (dubbed by Al Jolson) 
1952 Has Anybody Seen My Gal? – sung by Lynn Bari, Gigi Perreau and Charles Coburn. 
1955 I'll Cry Tomorrow – sung by Susan Hayward, playing Lillian Roth, in this biographical film about Roth.
1974 The Conversation – sung by Cindy Williams' character, Ann, during a conversation.

In popular culture
The song helped inspire the name of the American casual dining restaurant chain Red Robin: the owner of the original restaurant, in the University District of Seattle, sang in a barbershop quartet which frequently sang the song, and in the 1940s he renamed his restaurant "Sam's Red Robin".

The English football club Charlton Athletic play Billy Cotton's version of the song as the team come out on to the pitch at their home ground The Valley.

The English rugby club Hull K.R. use an edited version of the song as their club anthem.

From Sesame Street, Robin says the title of the song during the end of the Elmo's World episode "Birds" before she leaves out the window

The song is sung by the title character in the final episode of Reilly, Ace of Spies.

In the season 3 episode of I Love Lucy, titled "Lucy and Ethel Buy the Same Dress" (1953), a portion of the song is sung by Fred Mertz and Ethel Mertz (William Frawley and Vivian Vance).

Rosemary Clooney performs the song in an episode of her 1956–1957 television series.

References 

1926 songs
1920s jazz standards
Songs written by Harry M. Woods
Al Jolson songs
Carmen McRae songs
Football songs and chants
Pop standards
Music published by Bourne Co. Music Publishers